Kabir Abdullahi Barkiya (born December 26, 1960) is a Nigerian politician and senator. He is representing Katsina Central Senatorial seat in the Senate of Nigeria and was the director general of Federal Roads Maintenance Agency (FERMA).

References 

Living people
Members of the Senate (Nigeria)
1960 births